Endangered Species is a posthumous compilation of unreleased tracks, guest appearances, and greatest hits by the late rapper Big Pun, released on April 3, 2001 by Loud Records, following his death in February 2000. The album reached a peak chart position of #7. The proceeds from the album were to be given to Pun's widow, Liza Rios, and their three children. Liza Rios claims to have only received a small royalty check from the sales of Endangered Species, and in response, auctioned off her husband's Terror Squad medallion in July 2005.

The album's single, "How We Roll", featured then R&B-newcomer Ashanti singing the chorus. The music video for the song features both artists animated using cartoon-styled 3D computer graphics. Fellow rapper and close friend Fat Joe, who was also the compilation's executive producer, revealed in the liner notes of the album that the title chosen for the compilation was in fact the original title for 2000's Yeeeah Baby. All of Pun's lyrics were included in the booklet of the disc, partly due to the limited amount of promotional tools available to the label, and partly because of a desire to emphasize Pun's technique as a lyricist.

Track listing

References

2001 compilation albums
Albums produced by K-Cut (producer)
Big Pun albums
Compilation albums published posthumously